Peter Pysczynski was a member of the Wisconsin State Assembly.

Biography
Pysczynski was born on June 27, 1892 in Milwaukee, Wisconsin. He was a member of Modern Woodmen of America. Pyszczynski died on November 20, 1946.

Career
Pyszczynski was a member of the Assembly from 1937 until his death. He was a Democrat.

References

Politicians from Milwaukee
Democratic Party members of the Wisconsin State Assembly
1892 births
1946 deaths
20th-century American politicians